All-Russian Scientific Research Institute Of Electromechanics (VNIIEM) is a research institute based in Moscow, Russia. It is currently a Roscosmos subsidiary.

VNIIEM designs and builds automated satellites for ecological, geological, meteorological observation. It developed the Meteor and Resurs-O series of satellites and operates them in concert with the Planeta Design Bureau. VNIIEM developed the Geosynchronous Orbit Meteorological Satellite. In addition, the institute has developed the control and navigation systems, as well as analog computers, used on meteorological satellites. Andronik Iosifyan was the first director of VNIIEM.

References

External links
 Official website

Research institutes in Russia
Companies based in Moscow
Roscosmos divisions and subsidiaries
Ministry of the Electrical Equipment Industry (Soviet Union)
Research institutes in the Soviet Union
1941 establishments in the Soviet Union
Soviet and Russian space institutions
Electronics companies established in 1941
Research institutes established in 1941